The Women competition at the 2022 World Sprint Speed Skating Championships was held from 3 to 5 March 2022.

Results

500 m
The race started on 3 March at 17:30.

1000 m
The race started on 3 March at 18.39.

500 m
The race started on 4 March at 17:30.

1000 m
The race started on 4 March at 18:39.

Overall standings
After all races.

Team sprint
The race started on 5 March at 18:00.

References

Women